Dmitri Naghiyev (born 27 November 1995) is a professional footballer who plays as a right-back for FC Inhulets Petrove. Born in Ukraine, he has represented Azerbaijan at youth level.

Career
Naghiyev is a product of the Youth Sportive School #15 Kyiv and FC Knyazha Shchaslyve systems.

He made his debut for FC Dnipro in the match against FC Vorskla Poltava on 20 November 2016 in the Ukrainian Premier League.

On 3 July 2018, Naghiyev signed a one-year contract with Sumgayit FK. On 4 August 2018, Naghiyev left Sumgayit FK.

Defender joined Lithuanian A Lyga club Stumbras for the rest of the 2018 season and debuted on 1 September 2018, during 2018 Lithuanian Football Cup quarter-final match against Viltis. He spent most of the year playing for the Stumbras B team in the I Lyga, making only single league appearance for the main team.

On 2 July 2022 he signed for Inhulets Petrove.

Personal life
Naghiyev was born in Ukraine and is Ukrainian from his father's side (though his surname sounds like Azerbaijani) and half-Ukrainian half-Azerbaijani from his mother's side.

References

External links
 
 

1995 births
Living people
Azerbaijani footballers
Azerbaijani expatriate footballers
People from Bila Tserkva
Ukrainian people of Azerbaijani descent
Citizens of Azerbaijan through descent
Association football defenders
Azerbaijan under-21 international footballers
Azerbaijan youth international footballers
FC Dnipro players
FC Mauerwerk players
Sumgayit FK players
FC Stumbras players
FC Dinamo-Auto Tiraspol players
FC Inhulets Petrove players
Ukrainian Premier League players
Austrian Regionalliga players
A Lyga players
Moldovan Super Liga players
Azerbaijan Premier League players
Azerbaijani expatriate sportspeople in Ukraine
Azerbaijani expatriate sportspeople in Lithuania
Azerbaijani expatriate sportspeople in Moldova
Expatriate footballers in Ukraine
Expatriate footballers in Austria
Expatriate footballers in Lithuania
Expatriate footballers in Moldova